St. Clair C. Bourne (February 16, 1943 – December 15, 2007) was an American documentary filmmaker, who focused on African-American subjects and addressed social issues. He also developed projects that explored African-American cultural figures, such as Langston Hughes and Paul Robeson. Not only was Bourne a towering figure in the documentary film world but also an activist, teacher, and organizer.

Biography
Born in Harlem, New York, his father was journalist St. Clair T. Bourne. The father also wrote scripts for African American documentary filmmakers William Alexander and Edward Lewis.

He moved to Brooklyn when he was two years old.  He completed two years at the Georgetown School of Foreign Service before joining the Peace Corps. In 1965, the Peace Corps sent Bourne to Peru where he helped publish a Spanish newspaper, El Comeno, in Comas, a settlement adjacent to Lima.  The November 1965 issue of Ebony magazine featured an article about Bourne's efforts in Comas.

Bourne graduated from Syracuse University in 1967 with a dual degree in Journalism and Political Science.

In 1988, a retrospective of his films was shown at the Whitney Museum of American Art. In a 36-year career in which he made more than 40 films, either producing or directing or doing both, Bourne's works were seen on public television, commercial networks and at film festivals around the country.

Bourne died in Manhattan of pulmonary embolisms following brain surgery on December 15, 2007. He was 64 years old.

He was a member of the Omega Psi Phi and Alpha Phi Omega Fraternities.

The finding aid to the St. Clair Bourne Collection can be found at the Black Film Center/Archive at Indiana University, Bloomington, IN.

Filmography 

 Half Past Autumn (2000)
 Paul Robeson: Here I Stand (1999)
 John Henrik Clarke: A Great and Mighty Walk (1996)
 Heritage of the Black West (1995)
 Sea Island Journey (1993)
 Where Roots Endure (1989)
 The Making of "Do The Right Thing" (1988–89)
 Langston Hughes: The Dream Keeper (1986, 1988)
 On the Boulevard (1985)
 In Motion: Amiri Baraka (1983)
 The Black and the Green (1982–84)
 Let the Church Say Amen! (1974)
 Something to Build On (1971)
 Malcolm X Liberation University: Black Journal (1969)
 General (1965, 1988–2002)
 America--Black and White (undated)

References

Further reading
Interview. "St. Clair Bourne". Black Camera 21.2 (2006): 9–14. Retrieved June 2, 2016. 
Sandler, Kathe. "Bright Moments: The Life and Work of St. Clair Bourne", Nka: Journal of Contemporary African Art 25.1 (2009): 144–149. Project MUSE. Retrieved June 2, 2016.

External links

St. Clair Bourne Collection at Indiana University Bloomington Black Film Center/Archive.
Dennis McLellan (Los Angeles Times), "St. Clair Bourne; captured the black experience on film", Boston Globe, December 20, 2007.
Dennis Hevesi, "St.Clair Bourne, Filmmaker, Dies at 64", The New York Times, December 18, 2007. 

1943 births
2007 deaths
Syracuse University alumni
People from Brooklyn
American documentary filmmakers
Deaths from pulmonary embolism
Walsh School of Foreign Service alumni